Beppo: A Venetian Story is a lengthy poem by Lord Byron, written in Venice in 1817. Beppo marks Byron's first attempt at writing using the Italian ottava rima metre, which emphasized satiric digression. It is the precursor to Byron's most famous and generally considered best poem, Don Juan. The poem contains 760 verses, divided into 95 stanzas.

Narrative
The poem tells the story of a Venetian lady, Laura, whose husband, Giuseppe (or "Beppo" for short), has been lost at sea for the past three years. According to Venetian customs she takes on a Cavalier Servente, simply called "the Count". When the two of them attend the Venetian Carnival, she is closely observed by a Turk who turns out to be her missing husband. Beppo explains that he has been captured and enslaved, and was freed by a band of pirates that he subsequently joined. Having accumulated enough money he left piracy and returned to reclaim his wife and be re-baptized. Laura rejoins Beppo and befriends the Count.

Analysis and allusions
The poem's main merit lies in its comparison of English and Italian morals, arguing that the English aversion to adultery is mere hypocrisy in light of the probably shocking, but more honest, custom of the Cavalier Servente in Italy. In comparison to Byron's Oriental Tales of 1813, it suggests that a looser attitude towards morals may be more pragmatic.

The poem manifests a number of typical Byronic qualities, like the digressive structure and the use of satirical jabs at targets familiar to Byron's readership, such as literate women and as well as other poets (including Robert Southey, who appears as "Botherby"). As he does in major poems like Childe Harold's Pilgrimage and Don Juan, in Beppo Byron mixes fictional elements with autobiographical ones.

Reputedly, Lady William Russell was the inspiration for "[one] whose bloom could, after dancing, dare the dawn".

References

External links

Poetry by Lord Byron
1817 poems